Sealion Shipping Limited was a British shipping and consultancy company specialized on the support of the offshore oil and gas industry. The company was established in January 1975. In 1982, Sealion expanded its activities into the support of the offshore oil and gas industry. It operates the Toisa fleet of 25 various types of offshore vessels, including well test and servicing vessel Toisa Pisces.

References

External links
 

Floating production storage and offloading vessel operators
Shipping companies of the United Kingdom
Transport companies established in 1975
1975 establishments in England